William David Sanders (born December 2, 1941) is an American real estate businessman and developer.

Biography
Sanders was born in 1941 in Ramsey County, Minnesota, the son of Marion Jane (Birkenstein) and David Edwin Sanders, an advertising agency owner. His father was born in Parral, Chihuahua, Mexico, to German Jewish immigrants. Sanders' maternal grandfather was born in Chicago to German Jewish parents while his maternal grandmother was also born in Chicago to Irish Catholic parents. He was raised in El Paso, Texas. In 1964, Sanders graduated from Cornell University College of Agriculture and Life Sciences. In 1968, he founded the real estate firm LaSalle Partners, headquartered in Chicago. In 1999, LaSalle Partners merged with Jones Lang Wooton to form Jones Lang LaSalle.

He served as chairman of the National Association of Real Estate Investment Trusts (NAREIT). In 1999, he received Cornell's "Entrepreneur of the Year" award.

Sanders once managed a real estate portfolio of $20 billion, and was referred to as the "Warren Buffett of real estate" by Bloomberg News in 1999.

Personal life
Sanders married Louann H. Feuille on May 18, 1974 in El Paso. They have two sons and three daughters.

Sanders' middle daughter, Amy, is the wife of Beto O'Rourke, former Democratic U.S. Rep. of Texas's 16th congressional district.

References

External links
 Profile of William Sanders by Real Estate Portfolio magazine

1941 births
Living people
American real estate businesspeople
Cornell University College of Agriculture and Life Sciences alumni
Businesspeople from Minnesota
American people of German-Jewish descent
People from Ramsey County, Minnesota
20th-century American businesspeople
21st-century American businesspeople
American people of Irish descent
Businesspeople from El Paso, Texas
American people of Mexican-Jewish descent